Ex Hex is an American rock band formed in 2013. The band consists of Mary Timony, Betsy Wright and Laura Harris. Ex Hex recorded its first single, "Hot and Cold" in Timony's basement, then went on to record Rips, with Mitch Easter and Jonah Takagi. on October 7, 2014, the record debuted on Merge Records. They toured extensively, playing with Speedy Ortiz, King Tuff, Rocket from the Crypt, and The Jacuzzi Boys, among others. Ex Hex performed at Coachella Festival in the summer of 2016.

On January 9, 2019, the band announced their second album, It's Real, released on March 22, 2019, on Merge Records.

Discography
Albums
 Rips (2014)
 It's Real (2019)

Singles
 "Hot and Cold" 7" (2014)

References

All-female punk bands
Punk rock groups from Washington, D.C.
American musical trios
Merge Records artists
2013 establishments in Washington, D.C.